Thymus carnosus is a species of flowering plant in the family Lamiaceae. It is native to southern Portugal and Spain. Its white, lilac, or pink flowers are borne on  spikes and are protected by oval green bracts.

The plant is hardy from USDA Zones 7–11.

References

carnosus
Flora of Portugal
Flora of Spain
Perennial plants
Herbs
Taxa named by Pierre Edmond Boissier
Endemic flora of the Iberian Peninsula